Shing-a-ling is a Filipino snack made from dried thick egg noodles locally known as pancit miki that is deep-fried and dusted with garlic, chili, and beef powder. It can also be eaten as is with a vinegar-based dip, or dusted in sugar. Some commercial versions directly fry wheat dough. It has a distinctive shape that resembles green beans.

See also
Kumukunsi
Lokot-lokot

References 

Philippine snack food
Philippine noodle dishes